Sergiy Stakhovsky and Mikhail Youzhny were the defending champions but decided not to participate together. Stakhovsky plays alongside Michael Kohlmann, while Youzhny partners up with Marcos Baghdatis. Both pairs, however, lost in the quarterfinals and first round, respectively, to Mariusz Fyrstenberg and Marcin Matkowski.
Mahesh Bhupathi and Rohan Bopanna defeated Fyrstenberg and Matkowski 6–4, 3–6, [10–5] in the final to win the title.

Seeds

Draw

Draw

References
 Main Draw

Dubai Tennis Championships - Doubles
2012 Dubai Tennis Championships